Goth, Göth (also Goeth) or Góth is a surname of German and Hungarian origin.

The German-language surname is a variant of Goethe (also Göthe), which belongs to the group of surnames derived from given names, in this case given names in Got-, in most cases likely Gottfried (c.f. Götz). The name is comparatively rare; the German phonebook (as of 2013) has 179 entries for Göth and 28 entries for Goeth.

Notable people with the surname
Goth
 Elisabeth Goth, American horse breeder and businesswoman
 Marie Goth (1887–1975), American painter
 Mia Goth (born 1993), English actress and model

Göth or Goeth
 Amon Göth (1908–1946), Austrian Nazi commandant of Kraków-Płaszów concentration camp and executed war criminal
 Jennifer Teege, née Göth (born 1970) daughter of Monika Hertwig
 , née Göth (born 1945) daughter of Amon Göth and subject of the 2006 documentary Inheritance
  (1898–1944), Austrian teacher and resistance fighter against the Nazi regime
  (1803–1873), Austrian historian and naturalist
  (born 1957), German composer
  (1836–1926), German-American author

Góth
  (1873–1944), Hungarian painter, father of Sárika Góth
  (1869–1946), Hungarian actor and director
 Sárika Góth (1880–1953), Hungarian-Dutch painter, daughter of Móric Góth

Fictional characters
Goth family, characters in The Sims video game franchise
Bella Goth, a member of the family

See also 
 Goethe (surname)
 Goth (disambiguation)

References

German-language surnames
Hungarian-language surnames